The 1977 NCAA Skiing Championships were contested in Winter Park, Colorado at the 24th annual NCAA-sanctioned ski tournament to determine the individual and team national champions of men's collegiate downhill skiing, cross-country skiing, and ski jumping in the United States.

Five-time defending champions Colorado, coached by Bill Marolt, once again claimed the team national championship, finishing 24.5 points ahead of Wyoming in the standings. This was the eighth title for the Buffaloes.

Venue

This year's championships were contested at the Winter Park Resort in Winter Park, Colorado.

This was the fourth time Winter Park hosted the championships, previously hosting in 1972, 1959, and 1956.

Program changes
Two events were discontinued prior to the 1977 championships: men's Nordic and men's alpine skiing.

Team scoring

See also
List of NCAA skiing programs

References

NCAA Skiing Championships
NCAA Skiing Championships
NCAA Skiing Championships
NCAA Skiing Championships
NCAA Skiing Championships
NCAA Skiing Championships
NCAA Skiing Championships
Skiing in Colorado